Roger Rabiniaux (3 December 1914 – 27 October 1986) was a French writer and poet.

Biography 
Rabiniaud was a pupil at the lycée of Fontainebleau and at Lycée Lakanal of Sceaux, Hauts-de-Seine.

A teacher after having studied literature and law, then public works official (1940–1942), he was an editor in the Office of the Secretary of State for Communications Jean Berthelot. He engaged into the Résistance 
and entered the prefectural administration of Vichy France in 1942.

He published poems in various literary magazines before publishing the five volumes of Un jeune homme des années trente - including Le Soleil des dortoirs - and manifested himself brilliantly in 1951 by publishing L'Honneur de Pédonzigue, a book sponsored by Maurice Nadeau, Jean Paulhan and Raymond Queneau.

Works 
1951: L'Honneur de Pédonzigue, preface by Raymond Queneau, Corréâ
1952: Les Vertus craboncrague, 
1957: Les Enragées de Cornebourg, 
1958: Impossible d'être abject, Buchet/Chastel
1964: Les Rues de Levallois, Buchet/Chastel
1966: À la chaleur des hommes, Buchet/Chastel
1971: La Bataille de Saumur, Buchet-Chastel
1973: Les Bonheurs de la guerre, Buchet/Chastel
1978: La Fin de Pédonzigue, Simoën

References

External links 
 Article consacré à Roger Rabiniaux sur le site Le Matricule des Anges

20th-century French poets
Lycée Lakanal alumni
Prix Guillaume Apollinaire winners
Prix Sainte-Beuve winners
1914 births
People from Levallois-Perret
1986 deaths